is a Japanese footballer currently playing as a defender for Blaublitz Akita.

Career statistics

Club
.

Notes

Honours

 Iwaki FC
 J3 League: 2022

Personal life
Born and raised in Japan, his father hails from the Democratic Republic of the Congo.

References

External links

1997 births
Living people
Association football people from Tochigi Prefecture
Komazawa University alumni
Japanese footballers
Association football defenders
J1 League players
J2 League players
Yokohama FC players
Matsumoto Yamaga FC players
Iwaki FC players
Blaublitz Akita players
Japanese people of Democratic Republic of the Congo descent